This is a list of people who have served as custos rotulorum of Monmouthshire.

 Richard Morgan bef. 1544–1556
 Thomas Somerset bef. 1558 – aft. 1562
 Rowland Morgan bef. 1564 – aft. 1577
 William Herbert bef. 1584–1593
 Henry Herbert, 2nd Earl of Pembroke bef. 1594–1601
 Edward Somerset, 4th Earl of Worcester 1601–1628
 William Herbert, 3rd Earl of Pembroke 1628–1630
 Philip Herbert, 4th Earl of Pembroke 1630 – aft. 1636
 Sir Nicholas Kemeys, 1st Baronet 1645–1646
 English Interregnum
 Henry Somerset, 1st Duke of Beaufort 1660–1689
 Charles Gerard, 1st Earl of Macclesfield 1689–1694
 Thomas Morgan 1695–1700
 John Morgan 1701–1720
For later custodes rotulorum, see Lord Lieutenant of Monmouthshire.

References
Institute of Historical Research - Custodes Rotulorum 1544-1646
Institute of Historical Research - Custodes Rotulorum 1660-1828

History of Monmouthshire
Monmouthshire